Taşeli (literally "stone land" in Turkish) is a karst plateau in southern Turkey, in the ancient Cilicia Trachea. Taşeli plateau roughly covers the districts of Ermenek, Başyayla, Sarıveliler (Karaman Province), Mut, Gülnar (Mersin Province), and Taşkent (Konya Province) as well as interior uplands of the coastal Anamur and Bozyazı districts in Mersin Province and Gazipaşa in Antalya Province. The river Göksu and its main tributary Ermenek Çayı flow on the plateau.

The Taşeli Peninsula (Turkish: Taşeli Yarımadası) on the Mediterranean Sea, bordering Silifke to the east and Alanya to the west, takes its name from the plateau.

Karst plateaus
Plateaus of Turkey
Landforms of Karaman Province
Landforms of Mersin Province
Peninsulas of Turkey